Beach wrestling at the 2008 Asian Beach Games was held in Bali, Indonesia from 24 October to 25 October 2008. The competition included only men's events for four different weight categories.

Medalists

Medal table

Results

65 kg
24 October

75 kg
25 October

85 kg
24 October

+85 kg
25 October

References
 Official site

2008 Asian Beach Games events
Asian Beach Games
2008
Wrestling competitions in Indonesia